Ketapangia regulifera is a moth of the family Gracillariidae. It is known from Japan (Ryukyu Islands), Malaysia (Sarawak, West Malaysia, Kedah and Pahang), the Philippines (Luzon) and Taiwan.

The wingspan is 6.8–8.4 mm.

The larvae feed on Terminalia catappa. They mine the leaves of their host plant. The mine has the form of a linear-blotch mine on the lower side of food plant. The linear part of the mine is made by the young larva and is epidermal and is usually running from the median area near the mid vein to the leaf-edge with an irregularly curved trace. The blotchy part is elongated along the leaf-edge, with parenchymal tissues within this part almost eaten by the larva. Finally, the leaf-edge at the blotchy part is narrowly folded down causing the lower epidermis to shrink over the mining part. The full-grown larva emerges from the mine to make a cocoon outside. The cocoon is usually placed on the lower side of the leaf, mostly at the side of the mid or lateral vein. It is boat-shaped, whitish, partly stained by grains of frass and covered by five to seven bars of silken threads, without bubbles or globules.

References

Gracillariinae
Moths of Japan
Moths described in 1933